Hebden may refer to:

People 
Hebden (surname)

Places in England 
Hebden, North Yorkshire, England, a village
Hebden Royd, a civil parish in West Yorkshire, England
Hebden Bridge, a town thereof
Hebden Bridge railway station, a National Rail depot situated therein

See also
Ebden (disambiguation)
Ebdon, a surname